The 2013 World Combat Games was held in Saint Petersburg, Russia, from October 18 to 26, 2013.

Venues

Schedule

Games

Opening ceremony
The opening ceremony was officially opened on October 18, 2013 at 20:30-22:00 local time.

Sports
Compared to the 5 sports and 38 events in the Olympic Games, the 2013 Combat Games featured 15 sports and 135 events throughout the 9 days of the competition, with added disciplines in some events. The 2013 Combat Games comprised more sports and events than the last one, as 12 sports and 136 events were in 2010. Fencing and Savate made their debut at these Games. Aikido, however, is the sole demonstration sport here.

Boxing
Fencing
Judo
Ju-Jitsu
Karate
Kendo
Kickboxing
Muaythai
Sambo
Savate
Sumo
Taekwondo
Wrestling
Wushu

Participating nations
A total of 97 national teams came to compete in these Games. The number of athletes for each nation are in the brackets. However, a World Team was created for all three team wrestling events.

 (1)
 (3)
 (12)
 (1)
 (17)
 (5)
 (14)
 (17)
 (11)
 (1)
 (1)
 (36)
 (17)
 (22)
 (7)
 (7)
 (9)
 (2)
 (1)
 (14)
 (7)
 (1)
 (3)
 (8)
 (13)
 (2)
 (5)
 (9)
 (71)
 (9)
 (24)
 (14)
 (6)
 (2)
 (1)
 (12)
 (20)
 (6)
 (4)
 (5)
 (6)
 (35)
 (6)
 (46)
 (45)
 (4)
 (20)
 (13)
 (2)
 (4)
 (1)
 (3)
 (2)
 (6)
 (8)
 (2)
 (11)
 (19)
 (1)
 (20)
 (14)
 (15)
 (2)
 (4)
 (35)
 (1)
 (30)
 (4)
 (34)
 (4)
 (16)
 (172) Host
 (7)
 (16)
 (6)
 (4)
 (10)
 (8)
 (19)
 (1)
 (16)
 (6)
 (3)
 (9)
 (1)
 (1)
 (6)
 (17)
 (53)
 (48)
 (7)
 (20)
 (22)
 (9)

Reference: 2013 World Combat Games List of Participating Countries (Click the "Athletes" tab for the list)

Medal table
Key:
Final medal tally below.

References

External links
 Official Site

 
2013
World Combat Games
World Combat Games
Sports competitions in Moscow
2013 in Moscow
International sports competitions hosted by Russia
Multi-sport events in Russia